Anuak or Anywa is a Luo language which belongs to the western Nilotic branch of the Nilotic language family. It is spoken primarily in the western part of Ethiopia and also in South Sudan by the Anuak people.  Other names for this language include: Anyuak, Anywa, Yambo, Jambo, Yembo, Bar, Burjin, Miroy, Moojanga, Nuro. Anuak, Päri, and Jur-Luwo comprise a dialect cluster. The most thorough description of the Anuak language is Reh (1996) Anywa Language: Description and Internal Reconstructions, which also includes glossed texts.

Phonology
Anuak is notable for lacking phonemic fricatives.

Consonants

Vowels

Diphthongs

Tones

References

External links 
 World Atlas of Language Structures information on Anywa

Languages of Ethiopia
Luo languages